Midway is an unincorporated community in Greene County, Tennessee, United States.

Minco Fused Silica Solutions for the World was headquartered in Midway until 3M purchased the plant in 2015.

The town of Mosheim has annexed some portions of Midway.

Recreation
Midway United Methodist Church maintains a community park.

Postal service
Midway currently has a shared post office with the town of Mosheim. The post office is located at 9280 West Andrew Johnson Highway, Mosheim, Tennessee, 37818. Midway has its own zip code (37809).

References

Unincorporated communities in Greene County, Tennessee
Unincorporated communities in Tennessee
Mosheim, Tennessee